Chervonodniprovka is a village (a selo) in the Zaporizhzhia Raion (district) of Zaporizhzhia Oblast in southern Ukraine. Its population was 64 in the 2001 Ukrainian Census. Administratively, it belongs to the Bilenke Rural Council, a local government area.

The settlement was first founded in 1922 as Chervona Zabora; in 1955 it was renamed to Chervonodniprovka.

References

Populated places established in 1922
Populated places established in the Ukrainian Soviet Socialist Republic

Zaporizhzhia Raion
Villages in Zaporizhzhia Raion